Norbertas Giga (born June 6, 1995) is a Lithuanian professional basketball player for Haukar of the Úrvalsdeild karla. He played college basketball for Jacksonville State University and graduated in 2018.

Professional career
During his early career, Giga represented KM-Perlas Vilnius in RKL.

Giga represented the Philadelphia 76ers during the 2018 NBA Summer League. His debut was 4 points and 1 rebound.

On September 23, 2018, Giga signed with Rytas Vilnius.

On August 8, 2019, he has signed 3-year deal with Juventus Utena of the Lithuanian Basketball League. Giga averaged 6.8 points and 3.3 rebounds per game. On July 17, 2020, he signed with Neptūnas Klaipėda of the Lithuanian Basketball League.

In August 2022, Giga signed with Haukar of the Icelandic Úrvalsdeild karla.

National team career
Giga represented Lithuania junior times twice during the 2012 FIBA Under-17 World Championship and 2013 FIBA Europe Under-18 Championship.

References

1995 births
Living people
BC Juventus players
BC Neptūnas players
BC Rytas players
Centers (basketball)
Haukar men's basketball players
Jacksonville State Gamecocks men's basketball players
Lithuanian expatriate basketball people in Poland
Lithuanian expatriate basketball people in the United States
Lithuanian men's basketball players
Midland Chaps basketball players
People from Kėdainiai
Spójnia Stargard players
Tallahassee Eagles men's basketball players
Úrvalsdeild karla (basketball) players